In Buddhism, especially the Chan (Zen) traditions, non-abidance (in Sanskrit: apratiṣṭhita, with the a- prefix,  ‘unlimited’, ‘unlocalized’) is the practice of avoiding mental constructs during daily life. That is, other than while engaged in meditation (Zazen).

Some schools of Buddhism, especially the Mahāyāna, consider apratiṣṭhita-nirvāṇa ("non-abiding cessation") to be the highest form of Buddhahood, more profound than pratiṣṭhita-nirvāṇa, the ‘localized’, lesser form. According to Robert Buswell and Donald Lopez, apratiṣṭhita-nirvāṇa is the standard Mahayana view of Buddhahood, which enables them to freely return to samsara in order to help sentient beings, while still remaining in nirvāṇa and being a buddha via the usage of the nirmanakaya and sambhogakaya.

Term 
Here, abide is used to translate pratiṣṭhita, meaning "to be contained in [a locale]" or "situated", from the prefix prati- ('towards', 'in the direction of') and ṣṭhita ('established', 'set up').

To translate pratiṣṭhita, Chinese Buddhists used zhù (住), literally "to reside, lodge, remain". Both wúsuǒzhù (無所住 'no means of staying') and wúzhù (無住 'not staying') are used for apratiṣṭhita.

Sutras 

The Diamond Sutra, a classic Buddhist text, is primarily concerned with the idea of non-abidance. The concept seems to have originated with the 1st-century Buddhist philosopher Nagarjuna, whose version of śūnyatā, or emptiness, entails that entities neither exist, nor do they not exist.

Realizing the depth of this concept was also responsible of a Chan master's sudden enlightenment. The Platform Sutra relates how the spiritual patriarch Huineng was enlightened after hearing his master Hongren reciting from the Diamond Sutra:

Huineng then responded that self-natures are intrinsically pure, cannot be generated or extinguished, are self-sufficient and capable of generating dharma.
However, this key incident, though found in the majority of texts, is absent in the older Dunhuang version.

The scholar-monk Qisong (契嵩) also noted in his foreword of the Platform Sutra:

Non-abiding leads to prajñā (wisdom), as it enables one to consider that worldly issues are empty, so there is no point in retaliation or disputes.

References

Buddhist philosophical concepts